Matthew "Matt" Panoussi (born 7 May 1977) is an Australian curler and curling coach.

He works for the Australian Curling Federation as a representative.

Outside of curling he works as a Test Leadership Consultant at UXC Professional Solutions Pty. Ltd.

Teams and events

Men's

Mixed

Record as a coach of national teams

References

External links
 
 

1977 births
Living people
Australian male curlers
Australian curling champions
Australian curling coaches